Daniel Jeannette (born August 8, 1961) is an Animation Director and Visual Effects Supervisor, known for his work on the Academy Award-winning 2006 animated film Happy Feet. In 2009, he supervised the Visual Effects and Animation for the Spike Jonze film ''Where the Wild Things Are.

References

External links

1961 births
Living people
Visual effects supervisors